Barlaston is a village and civil parish in the borough of Stafford in the county of Staffordshire, England.  It is roughly halfway between the city of Stoke-on-Trent and the small town of Stone. According to the 2001 census the population of the parish was 2,659, rising at the 2011 Census to 2,858.

History

Historic buildings

St John's Church
The old parish church of Saint John  is sited on the edge of the Wedgwood estate. It was built to the design of Charles Lynam in 1886-8, retaining the west tower from the original medieval building, with the subsequent addition of a vestry in 1969. In 1981 the Grade II listed building had to be closed owing to mining subsidence and a temporary building next to the church took its place until the new church was built on Green Lane.

Barlaston Hall

Barlaston Hall c. 1756 by Sir Robert Taylor (architect) was at one time a Wedgwood family home. 
The Grade I listed Hall has been restored after damage from subsidence.

Wedgwood
Wedgwood moved their pottery manufacturing business from Etruria, Staffordshire to a large modern factory in a new village in the north of the parish. The factory was planned in 1936 and built in 1938-40 to the designs of Keith Murray who was also a designer of Wedgwood pottery. The factory has a tourist visitor centre containing the Wedgwood Museum, with its own car-parks and a bus station.

Wedgwood railway station was opened for the factory in 1940 and is currently served by rail replacement bus (D&G Buses Service 14) on which all valid railway tickets and passes are accepted.

Transport & local amenities

Close by the village are: the A34 road; the River Trent; the Trent and Mersey Canal; a route of National Cycle Network; and the railway - which all pass west of the village.

Barlaston railway station, opened by the North Staffordshire Railway on 17 April 1848, is now on the Manchester branch of the West Coast Main Line - but inter-city trains do not stop and the local passenger service was taken over by rail replacement bus (First Potteries No 23) in 2014, on which all valid railway tickets and passes are accepted. The campaign for the local train service to be restored is continuing.

D&G Bus services  12 & 14 from Hanley to Stafford via Trentham, Eccleshall and Stone run through Barlaston

Barlaston Golf Club  is situated to the south of the town.

Education
Barlaston First School
140 years of Barlaston First school
The Wedgwood Memorial College in Barlaston is a Workers' Educational Association residential college, and also serves as the headquarters of the Esperanto Association of Britain.

Environment
Barlaston and Rough Close Common covers some 50 acres (20 ha) between Barlaston and Blythe Bridge and is a designated local nature reserve.

Downs Banks is located a little to the south-east of Barlaston. It is owned and managed by the National Trust and is also known as 'Barlaston Downs'.

Parish council 

Barlaston Parish Council is made up of eleven elected members who serve the community for a period of four years.

Election history
Barlaston Parish Council is made up of up of 11 councillors elected from three wards. The last elections were in 2019, and resulted in the election of 11 Independent councillors.

2019 election
The 2019 Barlaston Parish Council elections an uncontested election occurred in which all 11 seats were filled by independents. This was held alongside the Neighbourhood Plan Referendum on 7 May 2019.

Neighbourhood plan referendum 
Following the referendum which took place on 2 May 2019, Barlaston residents voted to adopt the neighborhood plan which will now be consulted upon in future planning applications. This also allows for the parish in order to shape the future development of the area.

Notable people 
 Francis Wedgwood (1800 – 1888 in Barlaston) a grandson of the English potter Josiah Wedgwood 
 Edward Proctor (1870 in Barlaston – 1944) an English footballer who played for Stoke & Port Vale 
 Josiah Wedgwood, 1st Baron Wedgwood DSO, PC, DL (1872 in Barlaston – 1943) Josiah Wedgwood IV a British Liberal and Labour politician, the great-great-grandson of Josiah Wedgwood, MP for Newcastle-under-Lyme 1906-1942. 
 Felix Wedgwood (1877 in The Upper House, Barlaston – 1917) an English author, mountaineer and soldier who died on active service in WWI
 Horace Barks OBE (1895-1983) Lord Mayor of Stoke-on-Trent in 1951–2, cultural interests were Esperanto and the writer Arnold Bennett.
 Harry Davies (1904–1975) an English footballer, played over 400 games for Stoke City & Port Vale, subsequently owner and landlord of the Plume of Feathers

Nearby places

Blythe Bridge
Downs Banks
Longton
Meaford
Meir
Oulton
Tittensor
Trentham

References

Further reading
Nikolaus Pevsner The Buildings of England - Staffordshire. Harmondsworth: Penguin Books, 1974; p. 65

External links

Barlaston Parish Council
Barlaston CE (VC) First School
Barlaston Village Hall
Wedgwood Website

 
Villages in Staffordshire
Civil parishes in Staffordshire
Borough of Stafford
Local nature reserves in Staffordshire
Wedgwood pottery